"Ebony Eyes" is a song written by John D. Loudermilk, recorded in 1961 by The Everly Brothers, and released as a single together with "Walk Right Back", which reached No. 8 on the U.S. Billboard Hot 100. The lyrics tell a young man's tragic story of losing his beloved fiancée in an airplane crash in dark, stormy weather conditions, conditions which remind him of his fiancée's "ebony eyes".

The single, a double A-side in the UK, reached No.1 in the UK Singles Chart on 2 March 1961 for 3 weeks and was the ninth best-selling single of the calendar year 1961 in the U.K. "Ebony Eyes" was initially banned by the BBC from airplay in the U.K. as its lyrics were considered too upsetting to play on the radio.

References

UK Singles Chart number-one singles
The Everly Brothers songs
Songs written by John D. Loudermilk
Teenage tragedy songs
1961 singles
Male vocal duets
1961 songs
Warner Records singles
Songs banned by the BBC